Helium Act of 1925, 50 USC § 161, is a United States statute drafted for the purpose of conservation, exploration, and procurement of helium gas. The Act of Congress authorized the condemnation, lease, or purchase of acquired lands bearing the potential of producing helium gas. It banned the export of helium, for which the US was the only important source, thus forcing foreign airships to use hydrogen lift gas. The Act empowered the United States Department of the Interior and United States Bureau of Mines with the jurisdiction for the experimentation, production, repurification, and research of the lighter than air gas. The Title 50 codified law provided the authority for the creation of the National Helium Reserve.

Privatization of Helium Act
The 104th United States Congress introduced four introductory bills in pursuit of privatizing the federal helium production and refining efforts of the United States. On October 9, 1996, the Clinton Administration abolished the U.S. Federal Helium Refining Program through the passage of the Helium Privatization Act of 1996.

Amendments to 1925 Act
U.S. Congressional amendments to the Helium Act of 1925.

See also

Airship 
Masterson, Texas
Cliffside Gas Field (Texas)
Mineral Leasing Act of 1920
Don Harrington Discovery Center 
Noble gas
Helium storage and conservation
Petrolia Oil Field (Texas)
Hugoton Gas Field
Loon LLC
Lifting gas
Shielding gas

References

Historical Bibliography

External links
 
 
 
 
 
 
 
 
 
 
 

1925 in American law
68th United States Congress
Helium
Presidency of Calvin Coolidge